Bishop Hezekiah Walker (born December 24, 1962) is a popular American gospel music singer and artist and pastor of prominent Brooklyn New York Pentecostal megachurch, Love Fellowship Tabernacle. Walker has released several albums on Benson Records and Verity Records as Hezekiah Walker & The Love Fellowship Crusade Choir.

Biography
Walker was born in Brooklyn, New York.  He attended Long Island University, majoring in Sociology. He also attended Hugee Theological Institute, and the New York School of the Bible. Walker became a bishop in the Church of Our Lord Jesus Christ of the Apostolic Faith in 2008, and transferred to the Pentecostal Churches of Jesus Christ later that year. Walker became the Presiding Prelate of the Pentecostal Churches of Jesus Christ in 2010.

In 2001, Hezekiah & The LFT Church Choir were nominated for an NAACP Image Award for Best Gospel Artist, Traditional on the strength of the album Love Is Live! Walker has won Grammy Awards for Best Gospel Album By Choir Or Chorus twice: once for Live in Atlanta at Morehouse College (1994) with The Love Fellowship Crusade Choir, and once for Love Is Live! (2001) with The LFT Church Choir.

Separate from The Love Fellowship Crusade Choir, Walker's LFT Church Choir released two albums entitled Recorded Live At Love Fellowship Tabernacle in 1998 and "Love Is Live" in 2001. LFT Church Choir was more youthful and hip-hop leaning ensemble than its predecessor and its album hit the Top 5 of Billboard's Gospel Chart and was nominated for a Grammy Award the same year.

In 2021 Pastor Frank Santora of Faith Church in New Milford, CT, and Hezekiah Walker joined together to start a church in Times Square, New York City, called Every Tribe Church.

Discography

Albums
 I'll Make It (Sweet Rain, 1987) 
 Oh Lord We Praise You (Sweet Rain, 1990)
 Focus on Glory (A&M, 1992) - STUDIO
 Live in Toronto (Benson, 1993)
 Live in Atlanta at Morehouse College (Benson, 1994)
 Live in New York by Any Means... (Benson, 1995)
 Live in London (Verity, 1997)
 Recorded Live at Love Fellowship Tabernacle (Verity, 1998) – by Hezekiah Walker & The LFT Church Choir
 Family Affair (Verity, 1999)
 Love Is Live! (Verity, 2001) - by Hezekiah Walker & The LFT Church Choir
 Family Affair, Vol. 2: Live at Radio City Music Hall (Verity, 2002)
 20/85 The Experience (Verity, 2005)
 Souled Out (Verity, 2008)
 Azusa: The Next Generation (RCA Inspiration, 2013)
 Azusa: The Next Generation 2 – Better (Entertainment One Music, 2016)

Compilations
  Gospel Greats  (Benson, 1995)
  Nothing But The Hits  (Verity, 2003)
  Divine Voices: Pastors of Praise  (Mack Avenue, 2015)

Singles
 "99½" (Benson, 1995) – Cassette Single
 "Let's Dance" (Jive/Verity, 1999) – CD Single/12" Single
 "Souled Out" (Verity, 2008) – Digital download Single
 "Every Praise" (RCA Inspirational, 2013) – Digital download Single

Trivia
Walker is sometimes affectionately referred to as "the Hip-Hop Pastor" due to the number of high-profile secular hip-hop recording artists who attend his church, such as Lil' Kim and Sean "Diddy" Combs.

Sony Music recording artist Carl Hancock Rux and Aaron Hall, lead singer of the R&B boy group, Guy, are among several artists who originally sang with Hezekiah Walker's Love Fellowship Choir and went on to record secular music.

References

External links
Love Fellowship Tabernacle Official Website
Verity Records Official Website

American gospel singers
1962 births
Living people